Million Dollar Mile was an American obstacle course competition television series that premiered on March 27, 2019, on CBS. Former NFL quarterback Tim Tebow served as the main host, with Matt "Money" Smith and Maria Taylor as co-hosts, and NBA player LeBron James as an executive producer. The object of the game was to run through a  obstacle course through Los Angeles's Westlake District and Downtown near the Los Angeles Center Studios, while avoiding various obstacles along the course, including a group of elite athletes whose goal was to stop them from winning the prize money à la American Gladiators, which could total up to $1 million if the entire course was completed successfully.

After just two episodes with low ratings CBS moved the show from its Wednesday slot to Saturday nights, beginning May 4, 2019. That two-week run did no better compared to the ratings of CBS's usual Crimetime Saturday rerun block, and it was again pulled, with six episodes still unaired. CBS later scheduled the end of the burn-off of the series starting July 6, 2019, with the remaining episodes airing weekly. Repeats have aired on CBS Sports Network.

Tier levels
After a contestant completes an obstacle ahead of the pro, they earn a level of prize money. However, they are not guaranteed that money until they successfully exit the course. At any time, the player can choose to go straight to the "exit obstacle" and attempt to finish that before the pro to take home the money earned thus far. Contestants who complete three obstacles are automatically guaranteed $50,000 regardless of whether they finish or not.

Ratings

German Version
An equally short-lived German version aired on ProSieben as Renn zur Million ... wenn Du kannst! (Run for a million ... if you can!) hosted by Daniel Aminati & Rebecca-Zarah Mir (or Rebecca Mir) in 2019 for only four episodes in total.

References

External links
 Official Website

2010s American game shows
2019 American television series debuts
2019 American television series endings
CBS original programming
English-language television shows
LeBron James
Obstacle racing television game shows
Television series by Warner Horizon Television
Television shows filmed in Los Angeles
Television series by SpringHill Entertainment